Strangers' Thoughts is a song by German synthpop band Camouflage from their 1988 debut album Voices & Images. It was released as a single in early 1988.

A video single was released in the UK, featuring album tracks from Voices & Images and the video for the single, directed by Rainer Thieding.

Track listings

7" single (Europe, 1988)
 "Strangers' Thoughts" (7" version) - 3:32
 "They Catch Secrets" - 3:26

12" single (Denmark, 1988)
 "Strangers' Thoughts" (longer) - 5:58
 "They Catch (More) Secrets" - 4:31
 "Zwischenspiel" - 2:38

CD single (Germany, 1988)
 "Strangers' Thoughts" (7" version) - 3:32
 "Strangers' Thoughts" (longer) - 5:58
 "They Catch (More) Secrets" - 4:31
 "Zwischenspiel" - 2:38

CDV video single (UK, 1988)
 "Music for Ballerinas" - 4:28
 "I Once Had a Dream" - 4:59
 "That Smiling Face" - 4:47
 "Strangers' Thoughts" (LP version) - 4:41
 "Strangers' Thoughts" (video)

References
http://www.camouflage-music.com/index.php?menu=discography&vid=2http://www.discogs.com/Camouflage-Strangers-Thoughts/release/1178017

1988 singles
Camouflage (band) songs
1987 songs
Metronome Records singles
Music videos directed by Rainer Thieding